Anthony Hulme (1910–2007) was a British film actor.

Filmography
 A Yank at Oxford (1938)
 The Body Vanished (1939)
 The Frozen Limits (1939)
 They Came by Night (1940)
 Laugh It Off (1940)
 For Freedom (1940)
 Up with the Lark (1943)
 Journey Together (1945)
 Send for Paul Temple (1946)
 The Mysterious Mr. Nicholson (1947)
 The Three Weird Sisters (1948)
 Cardboard Cavalier (1949)
 It's a Grand Life (1953)

References

External links
 

1910 births
2007 deaths
British male film actors
People from Dolgellau